The Faroese Women's Super Cup is a football competition contested between the 1. deild kvinnur champions and the winners of the Faroese Women's Cup from the previous season.

History
The competition was introduced in 2019 and, as its men's counterpart, is organized in a partnership between the Faroe Islands Football Association and the charity organization Lions Club. In its first edition it was won by HB, the league and cup runners-up, as EB/Streymur/Skála had won the double, in the same day the HB men's team defeated rivals B36 to win the men's competition. The Super Cup will now officially open the season of Faroese women's football.

Matches

2019

2020

The match was cancelled due to the COVID-19 pandemic.

2021

References

External links
Faroese Women's Super Cup at Faroe Soccer

Football cup competitions in the Faroe Islands
National association football supercups
Lions Clubs International
Women's football competitions in the Faroe Islands